Moceanu is a Romanian surname. Notable people with the surname include:

Dominique Moceanu (born 1981), American gymnast
Gheorghe Moceanu (1838–1909), Romanian physical education teacher

Romanian-language surnames